Angela M. Banks is an American lawyer and legal academic specialized in immigration and citizenship. She is the Charles J. Merriam distinguished professor of law at the Sandra Day O'Connor College of Law. In 2020, Banks was elected Member of the Council on Foreign Relations.

Life 
Banks is the daughter of two college professors. Her father, James A. Banks, researched education and social justice. Banks and her younger sister were raised in Seattle. She first became interested in law when her father shared stories about growing up in South Arkansas, the segregated South, and Jim Crow.

Banks completed a B.A. in sociology, summa cum laude, at Spelman College in 1995. She earned a Master of Letters in sociology at University of Oxford in 1998 as a Marshall Scholar. She graduated from Harvard Law School in 2000. Banks was an editor of the Harvard Law Review and the Harvard International Law Journal.

Banks worked as a teaching and legal fellow at the Harvard Law School. She was a legal advisor for Gabrielle Kirk McDonald at the Iran–United States Claims Tribunal. Banks worked as an associate for Wilmer, Cutler & Pickering and as a law clerk for Carlos F. Lucero of the United States Court of Appeals for the Tenth Circuit. From 2007 to 2017, she was a professor of law at the William & Mary Law School. Since 2017, Banks is the Charles J. Merriam distinguished professor of law at the Sandra Day O'Connor College of Law. In 2020, she was elected to the Council on Foreign Relations in 2020.

In 2021, Banks published her first book, 

Banks has two children.

References

Citations

Bibliography

External links
 

Year of birth missing (living people)
Living people
Place of birth missing (living people)
21st-century American women lawyers
21st-century American lawyers
African-American women lawyers
African-American legal scholars
Arizona State University faculty
College of William & Mary faculty
African-American women academics
American women academics
African-American academics
Spelman College alumni
Harvard Law School alumni
Alumni of the University of Oxford
Marshall Scholars
Lawyers from Seattle
Educators from Seattle
American women legal scholars
American legal scholars
Immigration law scholars